George Robert (Bob) Blakley Jr. was an American cryptographer and a professor of mathematics at Texas A&M University, best known for inventing a secret sharing scheme in 1979 (see ).

Biography
Blakley did his undergraduate studies in physics at Georgetown University, and received his Ph.D. in mathematics from the University of Maryland in 1960. After postdoctoral studies at Cornell University and Harvard University, he held faculty positions at the University of Illinois at Urbana–Champaign and the State University of New York at Buffalo before joining Texas A&M in 1970. At Texas A&M, he was chairman of the mathematics department from 1970 to 1978.

Blakley served on the board of directors of the International Association for Cryptologic Research from 1993 to 1995. He co-founded the International Journal of Information Security, published by Springer-Verlag, in 2000, and then served on its advisory board.

His son, George Robert (Bob) Blakley III, is also a computer security researcher.

Secret-sharing scheme
In order to split a secret into several shares, Blakley's scheme specifies the secret as a point in n-dimensional space, and gives out shares that correspond to hyperplanes that intersect the secret point.  Any n such hyperplanes will specify the point, while fewer than n hyperplanes will leave at least one degree of freedom, and thus leave the point unspecified.

In contrast, Shamir's secret sharing scheme represents the secret as the y-intercept of an n-degree polynomial, and shares correspond to points on the polynomial.

Awards and honors
In 2001 Blakley received an honorary doctorate from Queensland University of Technology.

In 2009 he was named a fellow of the International Association for Cryptologic Research.

References

American cryptographers
Modern cryptographers
Georgetown College (Georgetown University) alumni
University of Maryland, College Park alumni
University of Illinois Urbana-Champaign faculty
University at Buffalo faculty
Texas A&M University faculty
20th-century American mathematicians
21st-century American mathematicians
Number theorists
International Association for Cryptologic Research fellows
2018 deaths